Police College (Qatar) is a security college that works under the Ministry of Interior – Qatar and it has been established as per the Emiri Decree No. 161 of 2013, issued by Sheikh Tamim bin Hamad Al Thani, the Emir. The College is supervised by a Supreme Council that consists of 10 members representing the different authorities inside and outside the ministry.

The College was established as a  translation of Qatar National Vision 2030 with respect to the Interior Ministry, which aims to strengthen its human resources with highly qualified and trained officers in order to achieve the highest competency in prevention of crime and its control and thus maintaining order according to the law and the Constitution.
The college targets preparing scientifically and practically trained cadres in the police science and legal areas to be appointed as officers in the force. In addition, it will also develop curricula and methods of education and training to keep pace with the evolution of the knowledge in the legal and police fields.

The first batch of students was enrolled at the College on Saturday, 16 August 2014 for the academic year 2014–2015. They were 130 students from the State of Qatar and other the Arab states. A budget of QR 2.5 bn was allotted to the college in its first year. The second batch of candidate students were received on 5 October 2015.

Supreme Council of the College
As per the Ministerial Decree No. 19/2014 issued on 28 February 2014, the Supreme Council of Police College consists of 
 H.E Sheikh Abdullah bin Nasser bin Khalifa Al Thani – Minister of Interior as Chairman
 Maj. Gen. Dr. Abdullah Yousuf Al-Maal – Legal Adviser of Minister of Interior as Vice Chairman
 Brig. Dr. Mohammed Abdullah Talib Al-Mahanna Al-Marri – Director General of Police College as a Member
 Brig. Mahdi Mtlaq Al-Qahtani – Director of Training and Courses at Lekhwiya as a Member
 Brig. Badr Ibrahim Ghanem, Director of Technical Office of the Minister of Interior as a Member and Rapporteur.
 Col. Abdul Rahman Majid Al-Sulaiti – Director of Strategic Planning Department at Ministry of Interior as a Member
 Dr. Mohammed Abdul Azeez Al-Khulaifi – Dean of Law College at Qatar University as a Member.
 Dr. Khaled Mohammed Al-Harr as a Member
 Dr. Yousuf Mohammed Obaidan Fakhroo as a Member
 Dr. Ahmed Hassan Al-Hammadi as a Member

The validity of the council is 4 years as per the Ministerial Decree and it can be extended for the same duration once or more.

Logo

The logo of college was adopted based on three elements that represent components and outputs of the college.

The first element
Falcon in a state of alert and that means graduates at the beginning of their career

The second element
Pen's tip and book, represent systematic achievement in various fields of science and knowledge.

The third element
Flags that embrace Falcon and pen, representing peace, stability and security as one of the most important goals of the Ministry of Interior's strategy which is to achieve security and stability of the homeland.

Study Programs

The college offers a bachelor's degree in law and police science in Arabic medium. The duration of study is four years, divided into semesters each lasting 16 weeks.
Study Plan includes mandatory and optional course credits in Law and Police Science and general requirements, aimed at molding students with competent knowledge and skills of police and empowering them with successful main tools to do his job upon graduation efficiently and effectively.
The study system at the college is subject to the rules and provisions that are compatible with academic accreditation and quality standards in the best colleges of corresponding nature.
The study system in college is based on the best educational tools that ensures interactive learning in the classroom to build a student's abilities in critical thinking, problem solving and analysis. The college has been able to attract a group of professors qualified and experienced in education, teaching and training. Students enjoy mid-year leaves, college vacations, Eid holidays and summer vacation. In Summer vacation, student may enjoy English language support programs and the external field training that hones the skills of the student programs.

Buildings of the College

 The College consists of following buildings:
 Administration Building
 Languages and Information Systems Building
 Academic Building 
 College Library
 Sports Complex
 Olympic Complex
 Students Hostel
 Medical Clinic
 Training Fields

References

2013 establishments in Qatar
Educational institutions established in 2013
Educational organisations based in Qatar
Qatar